Edwin Carl Johnson (January 1, 1884 – May 30, 1970) was an American politician of the Democratic Party who served as both governor of and U.S. senator from the state of Colorado.

Background
Johnson was born in Scandia in Republic County in northern Kansas. As a child, he moved with his family to Elsie, Perkins County, Nebraska and then to Lincoln, Nebraska. Johnson attended Lincoln High School  After graduation in 1903, Johnson pursued his dream of becoming a railroad man, and after numerous positions became a train dispatcher/telegrapher at Fairmont in Fillmore County in southeastern Nebraska. In 1909, Johnson contracted tuberculosis and was advised to relocate to Colorado,  where the climate was believed helpful in his medical situation. After recovering from the disease he settled together with his wife near Craig, Colorado.

Career
Beginning in 1923, Johnson served in the Colorado House of Representatives for four terms. He was lieutenant governor from 1931 to 1933.  He represented Colorado for three terms in the United States Senate from 1937 until 1955, during which time from 1937 to 1940 he was an intraparty critic of the New Deal policies of U.S. President Franklin D. Roosevelt. Johnson served as the 26th and 34th governor of Colorado from January 10, 1933 until January 1, 1937 and from January 12, 1955 until January 8, 1957. He opposed FDR’s New Deal policies.

Bergman incident
He was perhaps best known for presenting a speech on March 14, 1950, on the Senate floor, criticizing the extramarital affair of actress Ingrid Bergman, who was, at the time, married to Petter Lindström. Bergman's affair with Italian director Roberto Rossellini became a cause célèbre as a result of Johnson's speech, forcing her to relocate to Europe for several years. Johnson then proposed a bill where movies would be licensed based on the perceived morality of the actors/actresses and stated that Bergman “had perpetrated an assault upon the institution of marriage,” and called her “a powerful influence for evil.”

Oddly enough, prior to the discovery of her affair, Ingrid Bergman had been Johnson’s  favorite actress. He felt that he had been deceived, and wished to ban her from any future Hollywood productions.

Bergman returned to Hollywood in the 1956 blockbuster film Anastasia. In 1972, Senator Charles H. Percy of Illinois entered an apology into the Congressional Record for Johnson’s attack, which had been made on Bergman twenty-two years earlier.

Atomic bombs
Johnson is also known for the alternative he presented to mankind in November 1945: "God Almighty in His infinite wisdom [has] dropped the atomic bomb in our lap." Now for the first time the United States, "with vision and guts and plenty of atomic bombs," could "compel mankind to adopt the policy of lasting peace … or be burned to a crisp."

Sport affiliations
Johnson was also the President of the Western League, a Class A baseball league, from 1947 to 1955. He was instrumental in the construction of Bears Stadium / Mile High Stadium, and was inducted in 1968 into the Colorado Sports Hall of Fame.

Death and legacy
He died at Saint Joseph Hospital in Denver and is interred at the Fairmount Mausoleum at Fairmount Cemetery in Denver. The eastbound bore of the Eisenhower-Johnson Memorial Tunnel is named for Johnson.

References

External links
 
Governor Edwin Carl Johnson Collection at the Colorado State Archives  Retrieved 19 February 2020.
"Colorado Governor Edwin Carl Johnson," National Association of Governors biography

 
Guide to the Edwin C. Johnson papers at the University of Denver Retrieved 19 February 2020.

Other sources
McCarthy, William T. Horse Sense: The Divided Politics of Edwin C. Johnson, 1923 - 1954 (Greeley, Co.: University of Northern Colorado, Unpublished Masters Thesis, 1996)
McCarty, Patrick Fargo  Big Ed Johnson: A Political Portrait (Boulder, Co.: University of Colorado, Unpublished Master's Thesis, 1958)

1884 births
1970 deaths
American Lutherans
Continental League contributors
Dispatchers
Democratic Party governors of Colorado
Lieutenant Governors of Colorado
Democratic Party members of the Colorado House of Representatives
People from Republic County, Kansas
Politicians from Lincoln, Nebraska
People from Fillmore County, Nebraska
Politicians from Denver
Democratic Party United States senators from Colorado
American people of Swedish descent
20th-century American politicians
20th-century Lutherans